Bartolome is a Tagalog surname and may refer to:

 Donnalyn Bartolome (1994), Filipina internet personality, vlogger, singer, songwriter and rapper
 Heber Bartolome (1948–2021), Filipino folk and rock singer, songwriter, composer, poet, guitarist and bandurria
 Vic Bartolome (1948), American former professional basketball player

Tagalog-language surnames